Simone di Filippo Benvenuti, known as Simone dei Crocifissi or Simone da Bologna (about 1330 - 1399), was an Italian painter. Born and died in Bologna, he painted many religious panel paintings, and also frescoes in the churches of Santo Stefano and San Michele in Bosco, both at Bologna.

Life
Simone dei Crocifissi was born in Bologna. He was son of the shoemaker Filippo di Benvenuto.  In the 17th century he was renamed "of the Crucifixes" (dei Crocifissi) for his "ability to paint great images of the Redeemer, for our sake nailed to the cross" (Malvasia). He trained with Franco Bolognese. 

He was active as a painter at Bologna from  1354 to 1399 in the wake of Vitale da Bologna's previous experience, which he engaged in a robustly more popular style of painting.  

The initial artistic phase of Simone Di Fillipo can be seen via the frescoes of the life of Christ that come from the church of Santa Maria di Mezzaratta (mid-1350s century), now preserved in the National Art Gallery of Bologna (Pinacoteca di Bologna), where the interest for Giotto's space and plastic solutions is interpreted with a sharp expressivity.

The influence on Simone of Vitale's painting style can be caught in works such as the polyptych 474, also preserved at the Pinacoteca. On the other hand, works like the Pietà by (1368), and the Crucifix of St. James (1370), on display in the same museum, highlight the influence of Jacopo Avanzi and his solemn style, even if re-interpreted stressing the devotional goal, as in the Madonna by Giovanni da Piacenza (1382). These are the characteristics that enabled Simone dei Crocifisso to reach a leading position in Bologna soon afterwards, gaining pre-eminence as the author of wooden altarpieces for local churches and for individual customers such as Nativity.

Further reading
E. Sandberg Vavalà, "Vitale delle Madonne e Simone dei Crocifissi", in Rivista d'arte, XI 1929, pp. 449–480
Eugenio Riccomini, La pittura bolognese del Trecento, (I maestri del colore 245), Fabbri, Milan, 1966
Massimo Ferretti, Rappresentazione dei Magi. Il gruppo ligneo di S. Stefano e Simone dei Crocefissi, Bologna 1981
Alessandro Volpe, Mezzaratta. Vitale e altri pittori per una confraternita bolognese, BUP, Bologna 2005
Pinacoteca Nazionale di Bologna. Catalogo generale. 1. Dal Duecento a Francesco Francia, Bologna 2004, pp. 98–152
Flavio Boggi - Robert Gibbs, Lippo di Dalmasio. «Assai valente pittore». Bononia University Press, Bologna 2013, pp. 37-41, and passim.

External links
 
Museo civico Medievale
Pinacoteca Nazionale di Bologna – National Art Gallery of Bologna

1399 deaths
Italian male painters
Gothic painters
Painters from Bologna
Year of birth uncertain
Trecento painters
Fresco painters